Asociación Civil LALA Fútbol Club is a Venezuelan football club based in Ciudad Guayana, which played in the Venezuelan Primera División between the 2019 and 2021 seasons. It was founded in 2011 and plays its home matches at the Polideportivo Cachamay.

History
Founded in 2011 as Estudiantes de Caroni Fútbol Club, the club first reached the Venezuelan Segunda División in 2013. In 2015, after a merger with Fundación Academia Deportiva Lala, the club changed name to Asociación Civil LALA Fútbol Club.

In December 2020, LALA was changing its name to Bolívar Sport Club, but the name change did not materialize.

References

External links
 facebook
 twitter

Football clubs in Venezuela
Association football clubs established in 2011
2011 establishments in Venezuela